The Order of the First Families of Virginia was instituted on 11 May 1912 "to promote historical, biographical, and genealogical researches concerning Virginia history during the period when she was the only one of the thirteen original colonies."

Membership
The Order of the First Families of Virginia states its membership criteria as follows:

No membership list is made available.  However, the Order of the First Families of Virginia sponsors the publication of Adventurers of Purse and Person, which provides genealogical information on early colonists through the first six generations.  The most recent edition is the Fourth, edited by the Order's genealogist John Frederick Dorman and published in three volumes, 2004–2007, to celebrate the four hundredth anniversary of the founding of Jamestown.  Two groups of colonists are included: 1. Virginia Company shareholders "who either came to Virginia themselves between 1607-1624/4, and had descendants, or who did not come to Virginia within that period but whose grandchildren were resident there;" and 2. "Immigrants to Virginia ..., 1607-1624/5, who left descendants."

Since the membership criteria of the Order of the First Families of Virginia is broadly similar to the stated inclusion criteria for Adventurers of Purse and Person, it follows that descendants of one or more of the "adventurers" included in the book, are also descendants of one or more of the First Families of Virginia.

One anonymous member remarked that the Order of the First Families of Virginia is "a scholarly, quiet group."

References

See also
 Jamestowne Society
 The Lost Colony

Lineage societies
 
History of Virginia
State based fraternal and lineage societies
1912 establishments in Virginia